The 2008–09 Odense Boldklub season was the club's 121st season, and their 48th appearance in the Danish Superliga. As well as the Superliga, they competed in the Ekstra Bladet Cup.

First team 

Last updated on 1 May 2009

Transfers and loans

Transfers in

Transfers out

Competitions

Superliga

League table

Results summary

Result by round

Matches

UEFA Intertoto Cup

Second round 

Odense won 4–1 on aggregate

Third round 

Aston Villa won 3–2 on aggregate

Ekstra Bladet Cup

Squad statistics

Goalscorers
Includes all competitive matches. The list is sorted by shirt number when total goals are equal.

References 

Odense Boldklub seasons